Juan Valiente (1505? – 1553, Tucapel) was a Spanish black conquistador who participated in the expeditions of Pedro de Almagro in present-day Guatemala and Chile. Taken into captivity as a slave in Africa, he was transported to Mexico, where he was purchased by a Spaniard who returned with him to Spain. As a young man, Valiente negotiated a kind of lease - permission to join a conquistador's expedition for the chance to earn profits and buy his freedom. He ended up staying in Chile.

Biography 
Valiente was born with another name in Western Africa.  In 1505 he was enslaved and transported to Mexico.  He was bought by Alonso Valiente, a Spanish colonist, who had him baptized as Catholic under the name Juan Valiente.  When the senior man returned to Spain, he took the young slave with him as a servant.

In 1533, Valiente signed a contract with his master. It allowed him to seek new chances as a conquistador and to return in four years with profits from the expedition to share with his master and use to buy his freedom.  He sailed to Guatemala and participated in Pedro de Alvarado's expedition. He went to Chile with Alvarado, and joined Pedro de Valdivia's company.

Such black conquistadors as Juan Garrido in Mexico were among those who participated in expeditions in the New World.  Many were also born in Africa, taken captive enslaved, and later became free, although Garrido appeared to have gone to Spain as a free man for his education. He may have been a chief or prince's son.

Valiente helped establish Santiago de Chile in 1541 and was compensated with a land grant for a ranch on the outskirts. Four years later, he received a commission.  He married Juana de Valdivia, an African and former slave, who once was held by a governor.

In Chile, Valiente made a certain fortune and could live freely. His master Alonso Valiente had not forgotten his business deal and wanted his money. Juan Valiente had tried to pay but, due to a corrupt official or middleman, he was unable to do so. After extending the payment period, the senior Valiente in 1541 sent a grandson to negotiate a purchase price with the slave so he could become free. Alonso Valiente insisted on recovering his money, but it was too late; Juan Valiente had died in 1553 and was buried in Araucanía.

Bibliography
 Matthew Restall, Los siete mitos de la conquista española, Paidós, 2005.
 Matthew Restall, “Black Conquistadors:  Armed Africans in Early Spanish America,” The Americas 57:2 (October 2000)

African conquistadors
Spanish conquistadors
1500s births
1553 deaths
16th-century Spanish people
Spanish people of Senegalese descent
People of the Arauco War
People killed in the Arauco War
Mexican slaves